Give Me Liberty is a comic book mini-series by Frank Miller.

Give Me Liberty may also refer to:

 "Give me liberty, or give me death!", a quotation attributed to Patrick Henry in 1775

Film
 Give Me Liberty (1936 film), an American drama short directed by B. Reeves Eason 
 Give Me Liberty (2019 film), an American comedy directed by Kirill Mikhanovsky

Literature
 Give Me Liberty, a 1936 book by Rose Wilder Lane
 Give Me Liberty, a 2006 young adult novel by L. M. Elliott
 Give Me Liberty: A Handbook for American Revolutionaries, a 2008 book by Naomi Wolf
 Give Me Liberty!: An American History, a 2004 book by Eric Foner
 Give Me Liberty, a comic drawn by Ted Richards

Other uses
 "Give Me Liberty", a song by David Haberfeld
 "Give Me Liberty", an episode of the television series Supercarrier
 "Give Me Liberty", the first mission of the video game Grand Theft Auto III
 "Give Me Liberty", the callsign of radio station WGML, licensed to Hinesville, Georgia, US

See also
 Liberty or Death (disambiguation)